New Hampshire Route 108 is a  north–south state highway in Rockingham and Strafford counties in southeastern New Hampshire.  The southern terminus of NH 108 is at the Massachusetts state line in Plaistow.  The northern terminus is at an intersection with New Hampshire Route 125 and New Hampshire Route 202A in downtown Rochester.

NH 108 is notable in being one of two routes (the other being New Hampshire Route 9) to intersect both U.S. Route 4 and New Hampshire Route 4 (a rare case of two completely separate routes in one state having the same number).

Route description

Massachusetts Route 108 
Route 108 begins at an intersection with Route 110 north of downtown Haverhill, Massachusetts, near Kenoza Lake. The highway proceeds due north, passing underneath I-495 before crossing into Plaistow, New Hampshire, where it becomes NH 108.

Plaistow to Exeter 

NH 108 runs along the eastern edge of Plaistow, near the Massachusetts border, before crossing through Newton into East Kingston, where it crosses NH 107A, then turns eastward to form a brief wrong-way concurrency with NH 107. Continuing north, NH 108 passes through Kensington, where it meets the north end of NH 150 and continues north into Exeter. In Exeter, NH 108 meets NH 27, NH 111 and NH 111A, forming a very brief overlap with the former two routes. NH 108 meets the western end of NH 88, then interchanges with the NH 101 freeway at exit 11.

Stratham to Dover

NH 108 crosses into Stratham where it meets NH 33, a connector to US 1 in Portsmouth which also interchanges with I-95, at a traffic circle. Continuing northward, NH 108 passes through Newfields and Newmarket, intersecting with NH 85 and NH 152 along the way. The road crosses into Durham and Strafford County, passing through the center of town just east of the University of New Hampshire main campus, and then interchanging with US 4. NH 108 continues through eastern Madbury and into the city of Dover.

Dover to Rochester
NH 108 interchanges with the Spaulding Turnpike (NH 16) at exit 7, becoming Central Avenue, the main road in downtown Dover. The road intersects NH 9 and NH 4 at Silver Street. NH 4 has its western terminus here. The three routes briefly run concurrently in the center of Dover, before NH 4 splits off towards South Berwick, Maine via Portland Avenue. NH 9 and NH 108 continue north until NH 9 splits off towards Berwick, Maine, near an intersection with the Spaulding Turnpike at Exit 9 (via Indian Brook Drive). NH 108 continues north into the city limits of Somersworth, where it meets NH 236, a short connector to NH 9 bound for Berwick. NH 108 serves as Somersworth's industrial strip, then continues north into Rochester. NH 108 terminates at the intersection of South Main Street and Columbus Avenue (NH 125), a terminus it shares with NH 202A. South Main Street continues into downtown as NH 202A westbound.

The Dover to Rochester section of NH 108 is scheduled for a $11.36 million improvement project, to begin in 2022, "to improve safety and mobility for drivers, pedestrians, bikers and transit users," according to NHDOT.

Major intersections

History
The designation for NH 108 was in use by 1927, essentially following its present-day route from the Massachusetts border to Dover.

Until the early 1990s, NH 108 ended in Dover at an intersection with NH 16 (locally, at the Central Avenue intersection with Stark Avenue / Dover Point Road). When NHDOT rerouted NH 16 onto the Spaulding Turnpike as a concurrency, the section of NH 16 from the noted intersection in Dover to NH 125 in Rochester became a northward extension of NH 108.

References

External links

 NH Route 108 Dover-Somersworth-Rochester improvement project from NHDOT
 New Hampshire State Route 108 on Flickr

108
Transportation in Rockingham County, New Hampshire
Transportation in Strafford County, New Hampshire
108
Transportation in Essex County, Massachusetts
State highways in the United States shorter than one mile